Sacred Heart College is a Roman Catholic secondary school for girls, and is located in Retreat Road, Newtown, Geelong, Victoria in Australia. It is now one of the largest Catholic secondary girls schools in Victoria.

The current principal is Anna Negro, with three Deputy Principals: Gerard Raven, Tanya Malley and Acting Deputy Principal, Catherine Gulli.

History
 In June 1859, the Archbishop of Melbourne, James Alipius Goold, petitioned the Sisters of Mercy in Dublin to establish a community in Geelong. Mother Mary Xavier Maguire, Mary Gabrielle Sherlock, Margaret Mullally, Joseph Manly, Rose Lynch and Novice Aloysius Ryan arrived on 3 December 1859. The  sisters  immediately set about providing Catholic education for all who desired it.  The boarding school and day school that is now Sacred Heart College was opened for the beginning of the next school year (1860) with 12 pupils, 6 of whom were boarders. In 1861 an adjoining orphanage was opened and very soon there were 50 girls being  cared for. The Sisters also staffed local parish primary schools in the area and after school hours were seen visiting the sick and aged in their homes and the hospital.  Within a few years, a large convent including a   chapel  as well as   school  buildings such as classrooms and   dormitories  had been  built.  By the  turn of the  century  the  college  was registered as "conducting"  a junior school (kindergarten and primary)  as  well as a senior and  boarding school.

Alumni Association
In 1924, a Past Pupils' Association was formed and this became predecessor of the Old Collegians' Association established in 1932. As well as the Geelong-based committee, a Melbourne Group was formed in the 1930s and in 1981 a Western District Group was set up to bring together former students from that area, many of whom had been boarders.

The association is now known as the Alumni Association. Today, each student automatically becomes a member of the Alumni Association upon her graduation from the College.

Notable alumni
Lucy McEvoy, AFLW player
Peta Credlin, political commentator 
Olivia Purcell, AFLW player 
Lily Mithen, AFLW player
Marisa Siketa, actress

Curriculum

The College offers subjects in the following areas:
 Humanities
 English
 LOTE - Italian, French and Japanese
 The Arts - Including theatre studies, music and visual art
 Religious Education
 Mathematics and science
 Technology
 Health and Physical Education

Some classes are also offered at nearby school St Joseph's College at VCE level, including Chinese.

Sacred Heart College the Victorian Certificate of Education, and has introduced the International Baccalaureate for middle years students. Year Eleven and Twelve pupils may also choose to undertake a Vocational Education and Training or Victorian Certificate of Applied Learning program.

See also
 Sacred Heart College (disambiguation)
 Sacred Heart
 Sisters of Mercy
 Geelong

References

Educational institutions established in 1860
Girls' schools in Victoria (Australia)
International Baccalaureate schools in Australia
Rock Eisteddfod Challenge participants
Schools in Geelong
Sisters of Mercy schools
Catholic secondary schools in Victoria (Australia)
1860 establishments in Australia